Loul Sessène (or Loul Séssène) is a village in Senegal located in the Sine-Saloum area, in the West of the country.

Administration
It is the chef-lieu of the rural community of Loul Sessène, located in the Fimela Arrondissement, of the Fatick Department and the Region of Fatick.

History
Loul Sessène is located in the territory of the former Kingdom of Sine.  In pre-colonial times, the Loul – a Serer title of nobility – resided in Loul Sessène,  founded by the Sène family.

Population
In 2003, the population was 3,601 with 407 houses.

See also
Loul
Serer people
Timeline of Serer history

Notes

External links
 Plan local de développement de la communauté rurale de Loul Séssène (2005–2010), 116 p.
 Maps, weather, videos and airports for Loul Sessene

Populated places in Fatick Region